Theodore Frelinghuysen Singiser (March 15, 1845 – January 23, 1907) was a Delegate from Idaho Territory.

Early life 
Born in Churchtown in Cumberland County, Pennsylvania, Singiser attended the common schools. He learned the art of printing, and then enlisted in the Union Army as a private in Company E, Sixth Regiment, Pennsylvania Reserves, on June 6, 1861.

Career 
He served as assistant assessor of internal revenue in 1866 and 1867, and engaged in mercantile and editorial pursuits. He studied law, and was admitted to the bar in Washington, D.C., in 1878. Singiser was employed in the United States Treasury from June 1, 1875, to May 31, 1879. He was appointed receiver of public moneys at Oxford, Idaho, in February 1879. He engaged in mining in Idaho and Utah, and was Secretary of the Territory of Idaho in 1880. He was also Acting Governor of Idaho Territory during the winter of 1881-1882.

Singiser was elected as a Republican to the Forty-eighth Congress (March 4, 1883 – March 3, 1885). He was an unsuccessful candidate for reelection in 1884 to the Forty-ninth Congress. He was the receiver of public money at Mitchell, Dakota (now South Dakota) from 1885 to 1889.

Personal life 
Singiser was a member of the Frelinghuysen family and had significant holdings in business. Singiser was also involved in mining. 

He died in 1907 in Chicago, he was interred in Chestnut Hill Cemetery, Mechanicsburg, Pennsylvania. 

Singiser never married.

Sources

1845 births
1907 deaths
Delegates to the United States House of Representatives from Idaho Territory
Pennsylvania Reserves
Union Army soldiers
Idaho Republicans
19th-century American politicians